Dent is a railway station on the Settle and Carlisle Line, which runs between  and  via . It is owned by Network Rail and managed by Northern Trains. It is the highest operational main line station in England.

Location
Dent railway station is on the historic Settle-Carlisle Line, with services to Leeds and Carlisle.

Facilities

There are stone-built passenger waiting rooms provided on both the northbound and southbound platforms. Access to the southbound platform is, somewhat unusually, by an unguarded barrow crossing at the south end of the station for foot passengers to use (a 30 mph permanent speed restriction for non-stop trains through the station is enforced for this reason). National Rail recommends that disabled passengers not use the southbound platform without assistance.  Like most stations on the line, there are no ticket machines available as yet (though Northern have stated they plan to provide one here) and so travellers must buy on the train.  Train running information can be obtained by telephones on the platforms or from information posters.  New digital information screens have also been installed here, though as of November 2019 these have yet to be commissioned.

Old wooden snow fences are still in place on the eastern side of the station (see image).  Dent Station buildings are now privately owned and are available to rent as holiday cottage accommodation.

History

The station was designed by the Midland Railway company architect John Holloway Sanders and opened in 1877 and originally closed in May 1970 but was reopened by British Rail in 1986 following a campaign to maintain regular stopping services along the line.

During the 1970s the station was rented out to Barden school in Burnley as an outdoor pursuits centre, providing accommodation for up to 15 pupils whilst they carried out various courses ranging from pot holing, caving, to geology and map reading.

Stationmasters

A Greenwood 1877 - 1879
Thomas Crossley 1879 - 1889
Richard Davies 1889 - 1898
George Palmer 1898 - 1904 
J. Roadley 1904 - 1907
John Johnson 1907 - ca. 1914
William Porter Nicholson from 1935 
Richard H. Lamb (afterwards station master at Sandal and Walton, later station master at Skipton)
Rodney Hampson 1952 - 1955

Services
On weekdays there were formerly five trains in each direction, with six each way on Saturdays and three each way on Sundays.  In addition, DalesRail services operate on summer Sundays from Blackpool North and Preston to Carlisle, with one journey in each direction.  Northbound trains terminated at either Appleby or Armathwaite until the end of March 2017, as the Armathwaite to Carlisle section was closed whilst the damaged embankment at Eden Brows was repaired.  Services through to the terminus at Carlisle resumed on 31 March 2017.

Since the May 2018 timetable change, the service has increased to eight northbound and six southbound calls on weekdays and six each way (including the DalesRail service) on Sundays.

References

External links 

 
 

Beeching closures in England
DfT Category F2 stations
Former Midland Railway stations
Railway stations in Cumbria
Railway stations in Great Britain opened in 1877
Railway stations in Great Britain closed in 1970
Railway stations in Great Britain opened in 1986
Northern franchise railway stations
Reopened railway stations in Great Britain
John Holloway Sanders railway stations
Grade II listed buildings in Cumbria
Dent, Cumbria